Valimitika is a village in the municipal unit of Aigio, Achaea, Greece. It is situated at the outflow of the river Selinountas into the Gulf of Corinth, 5 km east of Aigio. The railway from Corinth to Patras passes through the village. In 2011 Valimitika had a population of 575.

Population

External links
 Valimitika GTP Travel Pages

See also

List of settlements in Achaea

References

Aigialeia
Aigio
Populated places in Achaea